James Goldie (born 29 June 1940) is a Scottish former professional footballer who played as a striker in the Football League for Luton Town and York City.

References

1940 births
Living people
People from Denny, Falkirk
Scottish footballers
Association football inside forwards
Kilsyth Rangers F.C. players
Luton Town F.C. players
York City F.C. players
Poole Town F.C. players
English Football League players
Falkirk F.C. players
Dundee United F.C. players
Bo'ness United F.C. players
Scottish Football League players